Ukanomitama (宇迦之御魂神 – Mighty Soul of Sustenance - Kojiki) (倉稲魂命 - Nihongi) is a kami in classical Japanese mythology, associated with food and agriculture, often identified with Inari, the deity of rice.

Name and mythology
The Kojiki identifies Ukanomitama (宇迦之御魂神 Ukanomitama-no-Kami) as the child of Susanoo by his second wife Kamu-Ōichihime (神大市比売), a daughter of Ōyamatsumi (大山津見神), the god of mountains. This text portrays Ukanomitama as the younger sibling of the harvest deity Ōtoshi-no-Kami.

A variant account recorded in the Nihon Shoki meanwhile portrays Ukanomitama (here referred to as 倉稲魂命 Ukanomitama-no-Mikoto) as an offspring of Izanagi and Izanami who were born when the two became hungry.

The deity's name is understood as being derived from uka no mitama, "august spirit (mitama) of food (uka)". While the above texts are silent regarding the deity's gender, Ukanomitama has long been interpreted to be female, perhaps due to association with other agricultural deities such as Toyouke or Ukemochi.

References

Bibliography

Philippi, Donald L. (2015). Kojiki. Princeton University Press. .

See also
Toyouke-Ōmikami
Ukemochi

Shinto kami
Food deities
Agricultural gods
Harvest deities
Inari faith
Kunitsukami